Content is an unincorporated community in Jefferson County, in the U.S. state of Pennsylvania.

History
A post office was established at Content in 1887, and remained in operation until it was discontinued in 1908.

References

Unincorporated communities in Jefferson County, Pennsylvania
Unincorporated communities in Pennsylvania